Vasily Ivanovich Alekseyev (7 January 1942 – 25 November 2011) was a Soviet weightlifter. He set 80 world-records and 81 Soviet records in weightlifting and won Olympic gold medals at the 1972 and 1976 games.

Biography
At the age of 18, Alekseyev began practicing weightlifting at Trud VSS, trained by his coach Rudolf Plyukfelder until 1968, when he began to train solo. He was not a naturally large man like other super heavyweights but was encouraged to gain strength by adding weight. In January 1970 Alekseyev set his first world record, and during the World Weightlifting Championship in Columbus, Ohio, US. In 1970 he was the first man to clean and jerk 500 pounds (227 kg) in competition. During one of his early world records, Oscar State OBE remarked that the weight of over 460 pounds (209 kg) in the Olympic press looked so easy it could have been a broomstick. This was the beginning of a series of 80 world records Alekseyev set between 1970 and 1977. He received bonus funds by the Soviet government every time he set a world record (Soviet athletics were funded by the state); so he made it a point to gradually increase his world records by 1.1 pounds or 0.5 kg. He was unbeaten and held the World Championship and European Championship titles for those eight years. He was the first man to total over 600 kg in the triple event.

Many thought he would be the first to clean and jerk the mythical 600 pounds but it was never to be as his habit of increasing world records by only 1/2 kilo took so long that age caught up to him.

Alekseyev's performance in the Moscow Olympics of 1980 was a disappointment. He had by then become more of a recluse, training by himself without a coach. In the snatch he set his opening weight too high and was unable to lift it, scoring zero kilograms as the result. He retired from weightlifting after the Moscow Olympics.

In 1987, Alekseyev was elected to represent the Ryazan District for the Soviet Union's Congress of People's Deputies. Alekseyev worked as a coach between 1990 and 1992. Under his leadership, the Unified Team earned ten medals in weightlifting at the 1992 Summer Olympics, including five golds.

From 1966 Alekseyev lived in Shakhty, where in 1971 he graduated from the branch of the Novocherkassk Polytechnical Institute. He died on 25 November 2011 in Germany in a clinic where he had been sent for serious heart problems. He was 69. The Russian Weightlifting Federation reported his death and called him a "Soviet sports legend" and "one of the strongest people in the world". He was survived by wife Olimpiada and sons Sergey and Dmitry. Dmitry competed nationally in weightlifting, placing fourth at the 1988 Soviet weightlifting championships.

Legacy and awards
Vladimir Vysotsky devoted his "Song about weightlifter" (1971) to Alekseyev.

Alekseyev was featured on the cover of Sports Illustrated 14 April 1975, titled "World's Strongest Man." In 1999, in Greece, Alekseyev was acknowledged as the best sportsman of the 20th century. He was awarded the Order of Lenin (1972), Order of Friendship of Peoples, Order of the Badge of Honour (1970), and Order of the Red Banner of Labour (1972). In 1993, he was elected a member of the International Weightlifting Federation Hall of Fame.

In Shakhty, where he lived much of his life, there is a street and park named after him, as well as his monument installed in 2014.

Personal bests
 Snatch: 190.0 kg (419 lbs) on 1 September 1977 in Podolsk;
 Clean and press: 236.5 kg (521 lbs) on 15 April 1972 in Tallinn;
 Clean and jerk: 256.0 kg (564 lbs) on 1 November 1977 in Moscow;
 Total: 645.0 kg (clean and press+snatch+clean and jerk), on 15 April 1972 in Tallinn, the official world record total in 1972;
 Total: 445.0 kg (snatch + clean and jerk) in Podolsk.

24 January 1970 Clean & Press  210.5 kg (464lb)  Super Heavyweight  Velikie Luki
24 January 1970 Clean & Jerk  221.5 kg Super Heavyweight  Velikie Luki
24 January 1970 Total (3)  592.5 kg  Super Heavyweight  Velikie Luki
24 January 1970 Total (3)  595 kg  Super Heavyweight  Velikie Luki
18 March 1970 Clean & Press  213 kg (469.5lb) Super Heavyweight  Minsk
18 March 1970 Total (3)  600 kg  Super Heavyweight  Minsk
26 April 1970 Clean & Press  216 kg (476lb)  Super Heavyweight  Vilnius
26 April 1970 Clean & Jerk  223.5 kg  Super Heavyweight  Vilnius
26 April 1970 Total (3)  602.5 kg  Super Heavyweight  Vilnius
26 April 1970 Total (3)  607.5 kg  Super Heavyweight  Vilnius
28 June 1970 Clean & Press  219.5 kg (483.9lb) Super Heavyweight  Szombathely
28 June 1970 Clean & Jerk  225.5 kg  Super Heavyweight  Szombathely
28 June 1970 Total (3)  610 kg  Super Heavyweight  Szombathely
28 June 1970 Total (3)  612.5 kg  Super Heavyweight  Szombathely
20 September 1970 Clean & Jerk  227.5 kg  Super Heavyweight  Columbus
17 November 1970 Clean & Press  220.5 kg (486lb) Super Heavyweight  Volgograd
17 November 1970 Clean & Jerk  228 kg  Super Heavyweight  Volgograd
12/4/1970 Snatch  177 kg  Super Heavyweight  Shakhty
12/4/1970 Clean & Press  221 kg (487.2lb) Super Heavyweight  Shakhty
12/4/1970 Clean & Jerk  228.5 kg  Super Heavyweight  Shakhty
12/4/1970 Total (3)  615 kg  Super Heavyweight  Shakhty
12/4/1970 Total (3)  620 kg  Super Heavyweight  Shakhty
26 December 1970 Clean & Press  222 kg (489.4lb) Super Heavyweight  Dnipropetrovsk
26 December 1970 Clean & Jerk  229.5 kg  Super Heavyweight  Dnipropetrovsk
26 December 1970 Total (3)  622.5 kg  Super Heavyweight  Dnipropetrovsk
26 December 1970 Total (3)  625 kg  Super Heavyweight  Dnipropetrovsk
14 February 1971 Snatch  177.5 kg  Super Heavyweight  Paris
14 February 1971 Clean & Press  222.5 kg (490.5lb) Super Heavyweight  Paris
14 February 1971 Clean & Jerk  230 kg  Super Heavyweight  Paris
26 March 1971 Clean & Press  223 kg (491.6lb) Super Heavyweight  Wienn
4/7/1971 Clean & Press  223.5 kg (492.7lb) Super Heavyweight  Moscow
18 April 1971 Clean & Jerk  230.5 kg  Super Heavyweight  Taganrog
27 June 1971 Clean & Press  225 kg (496lb) Super Heavyweight  Sofia
27 June 1971 Clean & Jerk  231 kg  Super Heavyweight  Sofia
27 June 1971 Clean & Jerk  232.5 kg  Super Heavyweight  Sofia
27 June 1971 Total (3)  627.5 kg  Super Heavyweight  Sofia
27 June 1971 Total (3)  630 kg  Super Heavyweight  Sofia
24 July 1971 Snatch  180 kg  Super Heavyweight  Moscow
24 July 1971 Clean & Press  225.5 kg (497.1lb) Super Heavyweight  Moscow
24 July 1971 Clean & Jerk  233 kg  Super Heavyweight  Moscow
24 July 1971 Clean & Jerk  235 kg  Super Heavyweight  Moscow
24 July 1971 Total (3)  632.5 kg  Super Heavyweight  Moscow
24 July 1971 Total (3)  637.5 kg  Super Heavyweight  Moscow
24 July 1971 Total (3)  640 kg  Super Heavyweight  Moscow
26 September 1971 Clean & Press  227 kg (500lb) Super Heavyweight  Lima
26 September 1971 Clean & Press  230 kg (507lb) Super Heavyweight  Lima
26 September 1971 Clean & Jerk  235.5 kg  Super Heavyweight  Lima
19 March 1972 Clean & Press  231.5 kg (510.3lb) Super Heavyweight  Bollnas
19 March 1972 Clean & Press  235.5 kg (519.1lb) Super Heavyweight  Bollnas
15 April 1972 Clean & Jerk  236 kg  Super Heavyweight  Tallinn
15 April 1972 Clean & Press  236.5 kg (521.3lb) Super Heavyweight  Tallinn
15 April 1972 Clean & Jerk  237.5 kg  Super Heavyweight  Tallinn
15 April 1972 Total (3)  642.5 kg  Super Heavyweight  Tallinn
15 April 1972 Total (3)  645 kg  Super Heavyweight  Tallinn
29 April 1972 Clean & Jerk  238 kg  Super Heavyweight  Donetsk
18 June 1973 Clean & Jerk  240 kg  Super Heavyweight  Madrid
18 June 1973 Total  417.5 kg  Super Heavyweight  Madrid
1/3/1974 Clean & Jerk  242 kg  Super Heavyweight  Glazov
20 March 1974 Clean & Jerk  240.5 kg  Super Heavyweight  Erevan
28 April 1974 Clean & Jerk  241 kg  Super Heavyweight  Tbilisi
28 April 1974 Total  420 kg  Super Heavyweight  Tbilisi
6 June 1974 Snatch  187.5 kg  Super Heavyweight  Verona
6 June 1974 Total  422.5 kg  Super Heavyweight  Verona
23 September 1974 Clean & Jerk  245.5 kg  Super Heavyweight  Moscow
29 September 1974 Clean & Jerk  241.5 kg  Super Heavyweight  Manila
29 September 1974 Total  425 kg  Super Heavyweight  Manila
27 November 1974 Clean & Jerk  242.5 kg  Super Heavyweight  London
14 December 1974 Clean & Jerk  243 kg  Super Heavyweight  Zaporizhia
29 December 1974 Clean & Jerk  243.5 kg  Super Heavyweight  Lipetsk
7/11/1975 Clean & Jerk  245 kg  Super Heavyweight  Vilnius
23 September 1975 Total  427.5 kg  Super Heavyweight  Moscow
11 November 1975 Clean and Jerk  246 kg  Super Heavyweight  Arkhangelsk
11 November 1975 Total  430 kg  Super Heavyweight  Arkhangelsk
12/7/1975 Clean & Jerk  247.5 kg  Super Heavyweight  Montreal
15 May 1976 Total  435 kg  Super Heavyweight  Karaganda
27 July 1976 Clean & Jerk  255 kg  Super Heavyweight  Montreal
9/1/1977 Clean & Jerk  255.5 kg  Super Heavyweight  Podolsk
9/1/1977 Total  445 kg  Super Heavyweight  Podolsk
11/1/1977 Clean & Jerk  256 kg  Super Heavyweight  Moscow

References

External links

 
 
 

1942 births
2011 deaths
People from Ryazan Oblast
Communist Party of the Soviet Union members
Olympic weightlifters of the Soviet Union
Olympic gold medalists for the Soviet Union
Russian male weightlifters
Soviet male weightlifters
Weightlifting coaches
Weightlifters at the 1972 Summer Olympics
Weightlifters at the 1976 Summer Olympics
Weightlifters at the 1980 Summer Olympics
Olympic medalists in weightlifting
Olympic coaches
Russian strength athletes
Soviet strength athletes
Recipients of the Order of Friendship of Peoples
Recipients of the Order of Lenin
Recipients of the Order of the Red Banner of Labour
Members of the Congress of People's Deputies of the Soviet Union
Medalists at the 1976 Summer Olympics
Medalists at the 1972 Summer Olympics
Sportspeople from Ryazan Oblast
European Weightlifting Championships medalists
World Weightlifting Championships medalists